Death is the second studio album by Spanish extreme metal band Teitanblood. It was released on 13 May 2014 through The Ajna Offensive and Norma Evangelium Diaboli record labels.

Critical reception

Pitchfork critic Kim Kelly described the record as "a complete homage to extremity and regression, yet it pushes boundaries that lesser bands never thought to look for." Kelly further stated: "Teitanblood grimly bring order to chaos, and with Death, have surpassed themselves once more."

Pitchfork's Brandon Stosuy also listed the album as number 19 on his list of "The Best Metal Albums of 2014".

Track listing
 "Anteinfierno" – 4:57
 "Sleeping Throats of the Antichrist" – 12:27
 "Plagues of Forgiveness" – 9:43
 "Cadaver Synod" – 11:20
 "Unearthed Veins" – 3:46
 "Burning in Damnation Fires" – 9:44
 "Silence of the Great Martyrs" – 16:36

Personnel
Album personnel as adapted from album liner notes.
Teitanblood
 J – drums
 NSK – vocals, guitars, bass

Guest musicians
 Chris Reifert – vocals (6)
 CG Santos – effects, programming

Other personnel
 Holy Poison – design
 Scorn – logo
 TK – cover art
 J. Félez – recording, mixing, mastering, production

References

External links
 

2014 albums
Teitanblood albums